Orpheum Theatre is a theater located in downtown Minneapolis, Minnesota.  It is one of four restored theaters on Hennepin Avenue, along with the Pantages Theatre, the State Theatre and the Shubert Theatre (now The Cowles Center).

The building opened on October 16, 1921, originally named the Hennepin Theater.  The theater actually consists of two separate structures: a long, fingerlike lobby that extends back from a narrow facade along Hennepin Avenue, and the auditorium, which is set back and parallels Hawthorne Avenue.  The restored lobby includes six terra cotta bas relief sculptures.  The auditorium is intricately plastered, with a number of garlands, swags, medallions, and other decorations.  The ceiling has a dome with 30,000 squares of aluminum leaf.

The building seats 1500 on the main floor and 1100 on the three level balcony.

Several musicals, including Victor/Victoria, The Lion King, and The 101 Dalmatians Musical premiered at the Orpheum.

In 1988, the Orpheum was sold by Bob Dylan (who owned it from 1979 to 1988) to the City of Minneapolis; it was renovated and reopened in 1993. In 2005, the city transferred ownership of its theaters to the Hennepin Theatre Trust.

Historic Theatre Group's original partner was Jujamcyn Productions. SFX (now Live Nation) bought Jujamcyn Productions in 2000. Live Nation sold most of its theatrical properties, including its Minneapolis operations, to Key Brand Entertainment in 2008.

1993 Renovation and reopening 
After being purchased by the Minneapolis Community Development Agency from Bob Dylan and his brother David Zimmerman in 1988, the Minneapolis City Council had an interest in revitalizing Hennepin Avenue as an entertainment street. The nearby State Theatre had been renovated and reopened in 1991, but the Orpheum had a deeper stage that would allow larger sets needed for shows such as Miss Saigon, which was scheduled to open on January 14, 1994. The city agreed to finance the renovation, issuing bonds to be paid back with a $2 surcharge on tickets for the Orpheum and State. The renovation cost $10 million.

Phase 1 
The first phase of renovation begun in January 1993, and involved expanding the stage by 20 feet, adding more dressing rooms, renovating the restrooms, and making the theater handicap accessible.

Change of plans 
Aesthetic improvements (cleaning the facade; restoring the lobby) were planned to be made in a second phase, but during phase 1, a terra cotta wall was found behind a plain wall in the vestibule, 85 percent intact. A laborer knocked through a layer of plain plaster and found plaster sculptural reliefs of griffins and urns.

Entertainment
Phish - November 26, 1994 Highlights include what was at the time the longest ever version of David Bowie (clocking in at 37:27) and the version of Slave to the Traffic Light featured on "A Live One". 
Barenaked Ladies
Luis Miguel - February 12, 2000
Crowded House - September 9, 2007
Diana Krall - March 15, 2002 August 7, 2015
Barry Manilow - February 28 - March 1, 2002
John Prine - September 30, 2000
Celtic Woman - October 22, 2005, April 5, 2006, April 17–18, 2007, April 13, 2013 (2 shows), June 13, 2017
Brian Wilson - September 30, 2004, October 2, 2016, November 28, 2018

Comedy 
Jeff Foxworthy taped Have Your Loved Ones Spayed or Neutered here in 2004. 
Larry the Cable Guy taped Morning Constitutions here in 2006.
Jeff Foxworthy and Larry the Cable Guy recorded the Netflix special We've Been Thinking here on March 19, 2016.
The Tonight Show Starring Jimmy Fallon recorded its Super Bowl postgame show here in 2018.
Musicals
Waitress
Mamma Mia!
The Lion King
The Phantom of the Opera

References

External links
 
 Orpheum Theatre

Minneapolis–Saint Paul
National Register of Historic Places in Minneapolis
Theatre in Minneapolis
Theatres in Minnesota
Theatres on the National Register of Historic Places in Minnesota